Jose Alejandro Gonzalez Jr. (born November 26, 1931) is a senior United States district judge of the United States District Court for the Southern District of Florida.

Education and career

Born in 1931, in Tampa, Florida, Gonzalez received a Bachelor of Arts degree in 1952 from the University of Florida and a Juris Doctor in 1957 from the Fredric G. Levin College of Law at the University of Florida. He in the United States Army as a lieutenant from 1952 to 1954 and in the United States Army Reserve as a captain from 1954 to 1960. He was a claims representative for the State Farm Mutual Life Insurance Company in Lakeland, Florida, from 1957 to 1958. He was in private practice in Fort Lauderdale, Florida from 1958 to 1964.  He was an assistant state attorney of the Fifteenth Judicial Circuit Court of Florida in Palm Beach County from 1961 to 1964. He was a Judge of the Seventeenth Judicial Circuit Court of Florida in Broward County from 1964 to 1978.

Federal judicial service

Gonzalez was nominated by President Jimmy Carter on July 6, 1978, to a seat on the United States District Court for the Southern District of Florida vacated by Judge Charles B. Fulton. He was confirmed by the United States Senate on July 26, 1978, and received his commission on July 28, 1978. He assumed senior status on November 30, 1996.

See also
List of first minority male lawyers and judges in Florida
List of Hispanic/Latino American jurists

References

External links
 

1931 births
Living people
University of Florida alumni
Hispanic and Latino American judges
Judges of the United States District Court for the Southern District of Florida
United States district court judges appointed by Jimmy Carter
20th-century American judges
State attorneys
Fredric G. Levin College of Law alumni
21st-century American judges